Tony Tan Lay Thiam (born 1970) is a Singaporean politician and businessman who stood as a candidate for the opposition National Solidarity Party in the 2011 general election. He was formerly an officer in the Singapore Armed Forces.

Education
Tan attended Victoria Junior College before receiving a Singapore Armed Forces Merit Scholarship to study Engineering at Trinity College, Cambridge where he graduated with first class honours. Tan also holds BSci (BioMed) degree from Central Queensland University and an MBA from the University of Leicester.

Biography 
After completing his degree, Tan served in the Singapore Army and was promoted to the rank of Major when he was 27. During his service, he was named the Top Student for the Basic Army Intelligence Course, Company Tactics Course and Combat Engineer Advanced Officer Course. After nine years, he left the armed forces at the age of 31.

In 1999, Tan and his wife established Smartlab Education Centre Pte Ltd, a chain of education centres. Tan was a recipient of the Spirit of Enterprise Award in 2006 and the company under his leadership was a recipient of a Singapore Prestige Brand Award (Promising Brand) in 2007.

Political career 
Tan and his wife joined the Reform Party ahead of the 2011 general election and were slated to stand as candidates for the party in the election. However they were among six members of the party who resigned in February 2011. Differences of opinion with the party's leaders were cited as the cause for their resignation.

Tan and Poa then joined the National Solidarity Party. In the 2011 general election, Tan and Poa were members of the party's five-person team which stood in the Chua Chu Kang Group Representation Constituency. The NSP's team lost to the team from the governing People's Action Party (PAP) by 56,885 votes (38.8%) to 89,710 (61.2%). As a husband and wife pair of former government scholars standing for an opposition party, Tan and Poa drew notable media attention during the election campaign.

Personal life 
He met his future wife Hazel Poa while they were both students at Cambridge. They got married and has two adopted sons.

References

National Solidarity Party (Singapore) politicians
Reform Party (Singapore) politicians
Singaporean politicians of Chinese descent
Alumni of Trinity College, Cambridge
Victoria Junior College alumni
1970 births
Living people